Rhantus suturellus is a species of predaceous diving beetle in the family Dytiscidae. It is found in North America and the Palearctic.

References

Further reading

External links

 

Rhantus
Articles created by Qbugbot
Beetles described in 1828